Takoua Chabchoub (born 10 March 1993) is a Tunisian handball player for OGC Nice and the Tunisian national team.

She participated at the 2017 World Women's Handball Championship.

References

1993 births
Living people
Tunisian female handball players
Expatriate handball players
Tunisian expatriates in France